Košarkaški klub Vršac d.o.o., commonly referred to as KK Vršac, is a men's professional basketball club based in Vršac, Serbia. They are currently competing in the Basketball League of Serbia. Their home arena is the Millennium Centar, with a capacity of 4,400.

Over the years, the club competed under different names, mostly after sponsor companies, carrying for an extended period of time the name of pharmaceutical company Hemofarm.

History
The club was founded in 1946 under the name KK Jedinstvo. From 1959 to 1967, the club competed under the name KK Mladost, when the name got changed to KK Inex Brixol due to sponsorship reasons. In the 1968–69 season, they won first place in the Vojvodina lower-league. In 1977, the club changed its name again, this time to KK Agropanonija. Four years later, in 1981, they again became champions of Vojvodina, which has won them the right to participate in the First B League, where they competed under the name KK Vršac. In 1989, Inex Hemofarm became principal sponsor and club changed its name to KK Inex.

The Hemofarm years: 1992–2012
Under the sponsorship of the Hemofarm Group since 1992, the club went from average participants of the lower leagues in Vojvodina to one of the leading clubs in the country. In the first season under the name of KK Hemofarm, they competed in the First League of Vojvodina and from year to year, went a step forward. In the 1995–96 season, team was led by Marin Sedlaček, a young and ambitious professional, who led the team to the higher league.

Hemofarm's top league status was achieved in the 1997–98 season, under the guidance of coach Slobodan Lukić. The first season among the elite kept their survival, but the following season, 1999–2000, they finished fourth in the standings, providing a first participation in Europe – in the Korać Cup. As newcomers to the competition, the 2000–01 season, led by coach Željko Lukajić, they reached the finals, where they were stopped by Spain's Unicaja Málaga, which was headed by Božidar Maljković. That same year, the team's quality was confirmed with placement at the National Cup final tournament, which was organized in Vršac for the first time, at the opening of the Millennium Centar.

In the 2001–02 season, they played the playoff semifinal of the national championship, where they were, this time, stopped by Budućnost after five dramatic games. In the next season, they played in the final of the National Cup, where they were defeated by FMP, and in the 2003–04 season, were also close to the title, playing National League finals against Partizan. The "Black and Whites" celebrated series victory in the fourth game of the playoffs, with the uncertain final basket by Vlado Šćepanović scored with the sound of sirens for the overall final series 3–1 win.

The 2004–05 season was the most successful in the club's history. As rookies, they won the regional Adriatic League. Hemofarm finished the regular season in first place in the standings, and at the Final Eight in Belgrade, they eliminated Bosna, FMP and Partizan in the final. That same season, Vršac was again hosting the final tournament of the National Cup, but Hemofarm lost to Budućnost in the first game. In the ULEB Cup, they reached the semifinals, where they were stopped by the Greek team Makedonikos.

In the 2005–06 season, they played once again in the ULEB Cup semifinals and took part in the Adriatic League Final Eight. In 2006–07, they played in the semifinals of the National Cup and the Adriatic League semifinals.

In the 2008–09 season, the team was taken over by Stevan Karadžić who led them to the semifinals in all competitions – Radivoj Korać Cup, Basketball League of Serbia, ABA League and Eurocup. Reaching the Eurocup Final Eight in Turin was a great success for Serbian basketball, especially as Hemofarm had the youngest team in the whole competition. In the first match of the tournament in Italy the "Pharmacists" have made another surprise, defeating favored Dynamo Moscow, but are uncertain in the semifinals in a precarious lost to Lietuvos rytas, which went on to win the competition.

In the middle of the 2011–12 season, Hemofarm Group stopped to finance the club after 20 years because of the financial crisis in the company. All of the players were informed that they are free to leave the club.

KK Vršac (2012–present)
In the summer of 2012, the club changed its name back to KK Vršac.

Sponsorship naming
The club has had several denominations through the years due to its sponsorship:
 Hemofarm STADA (2007–2012)
 Vršac Swisslion (2014–2016)

Logos

Players

Current roster

Players on the NBA Draft

Coaches

Hemofarm (1992–2012)

  Miroslav Popov (1993–1994)
  Miroslav Kanjevac (1994–1995)
  Marin Sedlaček (1995–1996)
  Ivan Jeremić (1996–1997)
  Slobodan Lukić (1997–1998)
  Željko Lukajić (1998–2005)
  Luka Pavićević (2005)
  Miroslav Nikolić (2005–2008)
  Vlada Vukoičić (2008)
  Stevan Karadžić (2008–2010)
  Željko Lukajić (2010–2012)
  Dušan Gvozdić (2012, interim)
  Nebojša Bogavac (2012)

Vršac (2012–present)
  Oliver Popović (2012–2014)
  Dušan Gvozdić (2014–2015)
  Miloš Pejić (2015–2016)
  Milan Gurović (2016)
  Vladimir Đokić (2016–2018)
  Goran Topić (2018)
  Mihajlo Mitić (2018)
  Branko Maksimović (2018)
  Darko Kostić (2019–2020)
  Zoran Todorović (2020)
  Vladimir Lučić (2020–2021)
  Vladimir Đokić (2021–2022)
  Siniša Matić (2022)
  Vladimir Đokić (2022–present)

Season-by-season

Trophies and awards

Trophies
Serbia and Montenegro League
Runners-up (2) – 2004, 2005
Basketball League of Serbia
Runners-up (3) – 2008, 2010, 2011
Radivoj Korać Cup
Runners-up (3) – 2003, 2006, 2008
Adriatic League
Winners (1) – 2005
Runners-up (1) – 2008
FIBA Korać Cup
Runners-up (1) – 2001

Notable players

  Milan Mačvan
  Boban Marjanović
  Stefan Marković
  Darko Miličić
  Marko Simonović
  Danilo Anđušić
  Mladen Jeremić
  Zlatko Bolić
  Petar Božić
  Đorđe Gagić
  Nemanja Dangubić
  Miloš Dimić
  Raško Katić
  Predrag Šuput
  Vladimir Tica
  Milenko Topić
  Nemanja Krstić
  Bojan Krstović
  Nikola Milutinov
  Nenad Mišanović
  Luka Mitrović
  Jovan Novak
  Miljan Pavković
  Slavko Stefanović
  Vanja Plisnić
  Petar Popović
  Dragoljub Vidačić
  Vladan Vukosavljević
  Jasmin Hukić
  Aleksej Nešović
  Marko Šutalo
  Saša Vasiljević
  Bojan Bakić
  Nebojša Bogavac
  Miloš Borisov
  Ivan Maraš
  Nemanja Radović
  Boris Savović
  Goran Jagodnik
  Nebojša Joksimović
  Rawle Marshall
  Márton Báder
  Jerome Jordan
  Moon Tae-Jong
  Mustafa Abdul-Hamid
  Robert Conley
  Vonteego Cummings
  Gerrod Henderson
  Kyle Hill
  Trey Johnson
  Rashad Wright

International record

See also 
 List of basketball clubs in Serbia by major honours won

References

External links
  

 
Vrsac
Basketball teams in Yugoslavia
Basketball teams established in 1946
Sport in Vršac
Companies based in Vršac